Daniela Ulbing (born 27 February 1998) is an Austrian snowboarder who competes internationally.

She competed for Austria at the FIS Freestyle Ski and Snowboarding World Championships 2017 in Sierra Nevada, Spain, where she won a gold medal in Parallel slalom.

References

External links

1998 births
Living people
Austrian female snowboarders
Snowboarders at the 2018 Winter Olympics
Snowboarders at the 2022 Winter Olympics
Olympic snowboarders of Austria
Medalists at the 2022 Winter Olympics
Olympic silver medalists for Austria
Olympic medalists in snowboarding